The Baram River is a river in Sarawak on the island of Borneo. The river originates in the Kelabit Highlands, a watershed demarcated by the Iran Mountains of East Kalimantan, which form a natural border with Sarawak. The river flows westwards through tropical rainforest to the South China Sea. The Baram River terminates in a delta, which is subdivided into two units: East Barma Delta of Middle-Late Miocene age and West Baram Delta of Late Miocene-Quaternary age. The western unit is composed of mudstones enriched in organic components (total organic carbon content is more than 1.0 wt.%) which constitute substantial oil and gas reserves.

The river is crossed not far from its mouth by the Miri-Baram Highway, Federal Route 22, on the Batang Baram Bridge opened in 2003. Some 100 km upstream lies the town of Marudi.

Etymology
Batang (meaning "trunk" in Malay) is the name used for the main river in the river system such as "Batang Baram" (Baram river). For upriver areas, such as the areas surrounding the headwaters, the place is named as "Ulu" (which means "upriver"). For example, "Ulu Baram" is the upriver part of the Baram river. "Long" meaning "confluence" is used by the Orang Ulu (upriver people). It is used to name the places located at the confluence between the smaller tributaries and the major river, same way as the Malay usage of the name "Kuala" (meaning river delta). The name "Pa'" (meaning "village") is exclusively used in the Kelabit Highlands such as "Pa Umor" village in Bario.

References

External links
Sarawak government website
WWF Heart of Borneo conservation initiative

Rivers of Sarawak
Rivers of Malaysia